Rhabdotis aulica, known as the emerald fruit chafer, is a species of Scarabaeidae, the dung beetle family, and is found in Africa. The pupae develop inside egg-shaped protective clay shells.

Description 

Pronotum with a white marginal/elytral band. Elytra with white dots drawn out transversally, comprising a humeral dot, an apical dot, 2 or 3 discal dots on the posterior half of the elytra and 5 marginal dots extended by a subhumeral dash. Tibia green.

Subspecies 
 Rhabdotis aulica ssp. impunctata Allard, 1992
 Rhabdotis aulica ssp. perpunctata Allard, 1992

Further reading 
 Allard (V.), The Beetles of the World, volume 12. Cetoniini 2 (Cetoniidae), 1992, Sciences Nat, Venette.

External links 
Rhabdotis aulica photos at Beetlespace.wz.cz

Cetoniinae
Beetles of Africa
Beetles described in 1781